The 1923 All-Big Ten Conference football team consists of American football players selected to the All-Big Ten Conference teams chosen by various selectors for the 1923 Big Ten Conference football season.

Ends
 Ray Eklund, Minnesota (BE; NB-1; WE-1)
 Elmer A. Lampe, Chicago (NB-1; WE-2)
 John W. Hancock, Iowa (BE; WE-3)
 Lowell Otte, Iowa (WE-1)
 Russell Irish, Wisconsin (NB-2; WE-3)
 Frank Rokusek, Illinois (NB-2; WE-2)

Tackles
 Marty Below, Wisconsin (BE; NB-1; WE-1)
 Stanley Muirhead, Michigan (BE; NB-1; WE-1)
 Leo Kriz, Iowa (NB-2; WE-2)
 Gowdy, Chicago (NB-2; WE-3)
 Boni Petcoff, Ohio State (WE-2)
 Louis Gross, Minnesota (WE-3)

Guards
 Jim McMillen, Illinois (BE; NB-1; WE-1)
 Adolph Bieberstein, Wisconsin (BE; WE-2)
 George Abramson, Minnesota (NB-1)
 Lloyd Rohrke, Chicago (WE-1)
 Joe Pondelik, Chicago (NB-2)
 Thomas Butler, Indiana (NB-2; WE-3)
 Gay, Minnesota (WE-2)
 Bill Fleckenstein, Iowa (WE-3)

Centers
 Jack Blott, Michigan (BE; NB-1; WE-1)
 Billy Young, Ohio State (NB-2)
 Ralph Claypool, Purdue (WE-2)
 King, Chicago (WE-3)

Quarterbacks
 Hoge Workman, Ohio State (NB-1; WE-1)
 Irwin Uteritz, Michigan (NB-2)
 Harry A. Hall, Illinois (WE-2)
 Malcolm Graham, Minnesota (WE-3)

Halfbacks
 Red Grange, Illinois (BE; NB-1; WE-1)
 Earl Martineau, Minnesota (BE; NB-1; WE-2)
 Harry Kipke, Michigan (BE [qb]; NB-2; WE-1)
 Bill McElwain, Northwestern (NB-2; WE-3)
 Jack Harris, Wisconsin (WE-2)
 Cully Lidberg, Minnesota (WE-3)

Fullbacks
 Merrill Taft, Wisconsin (BE; NB-1; WE-1)
 Earl Britton, Illinois (NB-2; WE-3)
 John Webster Thomas, Chicago (WE-2)

See also
1923 College Football All-America Team

Key

BE = Billy Evans released an all-conference team based on his polling of the conference's head coaches, with eight of ten providing their votes

NB = Norman E. Brown

WE = Walter Eckersall

Bold = first-team selection by a majority of the selectors listed above

References

1923 Big Ten Conference football season
All-Big Ten Conference football teams